The Peterborough Memorial Centre is a 4,329-seat multi-purpose arena in Peterborough, Ontario, Canada. Built in 1956, it is now home to the Peterborough Petes of the Ontario Hockey League and the Peterborough Lakers of the Major Series Lacrosse league.

The Peterborough Memorial Centre is a single-pad arena. It is most noted for having a large stage to the south end of the arena and a large portrait of the Queen painted by notable local artist David Bierk hanging above the ice. It is named in honour of the many war veterans who came from the region.

Along with hockey, the arena has hosted many events from trade shows, summer fairs, to lacrosse games and corporate Christmas celebrations for large industries such as Canadian General Electric.

In 2003, the Memorial Centre was renovated adding 24 luxury box suites, improved concessions, a licensed restaurant, new seats, boards, scoreboard and the addition of air conditioning. In late 2005, the building added a full video scoreboard. When the Memorial Centre was renovated, the stage was replaced with a restaurant.

References

External links

Buildings and structures in Peterborough, Ontario
Indoor arenas in Ontario
Indoor ice hockey venues in Canada
Indoor lacrosse venues in Canada
Ontario Hockey League arenas
Sports venues completed in 1956
Sports venues in Ontario
1956 establishments in Ontario